The Popovtsy ("priested ones") or Popovschina were from the 17th century one of the two main factions of Old Believers, along with the Bezpopovtsy ("priestless ones").

Historical backgrounds

As none of the bishops joined the Old Believers (except Bishop Paul of Kolomna, who was executed), ordained priests of the Old Rite would have soon become extinct. Two responses appeared to this dilemma: the priested Old Believers (поповцы, Popovtsy) and the priestless Old Believers (беспоповцы, Bezpopovtsy). As opposed to the Bezpopovtsy, the Popovtsy recognised the validity of the priesthood of clergy ordained by the State Church, receiving them into their fold, creating their own ecclesiastical structure, which would later break into a number of smaller movements (e.g., those who accepted the priesthood of the Belokrinitskaya hierarchy, the so-called Beglopopovtsy who rejected this hierarchy,  the Belovodskaya hierarchy, etc.).

The Popovtsy represented the more moderate conservative opposition, who strove to continue religious and church life as it had existed before the reforms of Patriarch Nikon. They recognised ordained priests from the new style Russian Orthodox church who joined the Old Believers and who had denounced the Nikonian reforms. Popovtsy have priests, bishops and all sacraments, including the Eucharist.

Spiritual centres of the Popovtsy

In the 18th - 19th centuries, the Popovtsy lived in communities on the Vetka Island on the Sozh River, in Starodub, along the Irgiz River, in monasteries of the province of Nizhny Novgorod along the Kerzhenets River, although they were scattered throughout Russia and even far beyond its boundaries. In the late 18th - early 19th century their spiritual centre was located in Moscow at the Rogozhskoye cemetery.

Belokrinitskaya hierarchy

In 1846, the Popovtsy convinced Amvrosii (Popovich, 1791-1863), a deposed Greek Orthodox bishop of Bosnia (who had been removed under Turkish pressure) to become an Old Believer and to consecrate three Russian Old Believers priests as bishops. In 1859, the number of Old Believer bishops in Russia had reached ten, and they established their own episcopate, the so-called Belokrinitskaya Hierarchy.

Beglopopovsty; Novozybkovskaya hierarchy

Not all priested Old Believers recognised this hierarchy. These dissenters were called беглопоповцы (beglopopovtsy) and obtained their own hierarchy in the 1920s. The priested Old Believers are thus represented by two churches that have the same beliefs, but treat each other's hierarchies as illegitimate.

Modern situation

The Popovtsy were hostile towards the October Revolution of 1917. For some time (in the early 1920s), the Soviet regime was rather tolerant towards the Old Believers as a whole, but in the 1930s, Old Believers too were subjected to severe repressions. Most of their churches were confiscated or demolished. During the Soviet period, the social strata which had been traditionally the backbone of the Old Believer population - peasants, cossacks, craftsmen, artisans, merchants and entrepreneurs, were practically extinguished. Nowadays Old Believers' churches are restored and recognized by the State.

Edinovertsy

Around 1800, a group of Popovtsy, mainly merchants from Moscow seeking the abrogation of discriminating legislation which obstructed their commercial activities, offered to acknowledge the leadership of the Synod of the Russian Orthodox State Church, on condition that they would be allowed to use the old books and rites. They came to be known as Edinovertsy and are generally not regarded as Old Believers, but rather Old-Ritualists.

Popovtsy Churches

The two churches of the 'Popovtsy are:

 Belokrinitskaya Hierarchy, also known as Belokrinitskoe Soglasie, officially called Russian Orthodox Oldritualist Church, has its centre situated at the Rogozhskoe cemetery in Moscow. It is the largest popovtsy church in modern Russia. In the 19th century, the Belokrinitskaya Hierarchy was subject to a schism of Okruzhnyy Raskol.
 Novozybkovskaya Hierarchy, officially known as the  Russian Old-Orthodox Church, former beglopopovtsy.

Further reading
 Храневич К. И. Поповщина // нциклопедический словарь Брокгауза и Ефрона : в 86 т. (82 т. и 4 доп.). — СПб., 1890—1907.
 Вургафт С. Г., Ушаков И. А. Старообрядчество. Лица, предметы, события и символы. Опыт энциклопедического словаря. — М., 1996.
 Старообрядческие иерархи. — М., 2002.

Old Believer movement